Brewster Heights is a census-designated place (CDP) in the town of Southeast in Putnam County, New York, United States. It was first listed as a CDP prior to the 2020 census.

Brewster Heights occupies a hilltop in the west-central part of the town of Southeast, in southeastern Putnam County. It is bordered to the south by the village of Brewster.

Demographics

References 

Census-designated places in Putnam County, New York
Census-designated places in New York (state)